Bivonaea is a genus of flowering plants belonging to the family Brassicaceae.

Its native range is Central Mediterranean.

Species:

Bivonaea lutea

References

Brassicaceae
Brassicaceae genera